Bethany Global University (formally Bethany College of Missions) is a private Evangelical Christian university in Bloomington, Minnesota. Its primary focus is on training missionaries and it was founded in 1948. It is one of nine work colleges in the United States.

Academics
The institution offers educational programs with a focus on theology, ministry, and Biblical outreach. Programs include certificates, Associate of Arts, Bachelor of Arts, and master's programs. All of the master's degree programs are provided entirely online.

References

External links
 Official website

1948 establishments in Minnesota
Bible colleges
Educational institutions established in 1948
Universities and colleges in Bloomington, Minnesota